Ricardo de Niro German (born 13 January 1999) is a professional footballer who plays as a striker for Chesham United. Born in England, he represents the Grenada national team.

Early life and education
German was born in Harlesden, and attended St Gregory's Catholic Science College in Harrow.

Club career

Chesterfield
German started his career in the academy of Chesterfield, and made his senior team debut on 17 September 2016 against Northampton Town, being subbed on after 89 minutes for Kristian Dennis, whilst still an academy player. He eventually signed professional terms on 10 October 2016, with manager Danny Wilson saying he could potentially be 'very good'. On 25 August 2017, German joined National League North side Alfreton Town on a one-month loan deal. On 22 September 2017, his loan was extended by a further two months. German joined Sheffield on loan on 16 October 2017. He joined Matlock Town on a one-month loan on 10 November 2017, before signing rejoining on loan to the end of the season on 16 February 2018.

Hendon
In the summer of 2018, German moved to Southern League Premier South side Hendon. German scored 21 goals in 28 appearances for Hendon.

Crawley Town
On 1 January 2019, German secured a move to League Two side, Crawley Town on a three-year deal. On 19 January 2019, he made his debut for Crawley, coming on as an 83rd minute substitute for Panutche Camará in a 1–0 defeat at home to Port Vale.

On 26 July 2019, German completed a loan move to non-league side Hemel Hempstead Town. German returned from his loan spell at Hemel Hempstead Town in January 2020. He scored his first goal for Crawley with his first league start for Crawley, scoring the opening goal for Crawley in a 3–0 win against Oldham Athletic on 7 March 2020.

In October 2021, he joined National League South club Dulwich Hamlet on loan until January 2022. On 4 February 2022, he was on the move again when he returned to former club Hendon on a one-month loan deal in the Southern League Premier Division South. German was released at the end of the 2021–22 season.

Chesham United
On 5th August 2022, German signed for Southern Premier League South side Chesham United.

International career
Born in England, German is of Grenadian descent. In November 2019, he was called up for the Grenada national football team. He debuted for Grenada in a 1–0 2022 FIFA World Cup qualification loss to Antigua and Barbuda on 4 June 2021. He was named as part of Grenada's squad for the 2021 CONCACAF Gold Cup.

Personal life
German is the younger brother of Antonio German, who is also a footballer whom represents the Grenada national football team.

Career statistics

Club

International

References

External links

Living people
1999 births
Footballers from the London Borough of Brent
People from Harlesden
Grenadian footballers
Grenada international footballers
English footballers
English sportspeople of Grenadian descent
Chesterfield F.C. players
Alfreton Town F.C. players
Sheffield F.C. players
Matlock Town F.C. players
Hendon F.C. players
Crawley Town F.C. players
Hemel Hempstead Town F.C. players
Dulwich Hamlet F.C. players
Chesham United F.C. players
English Football League players
National League (English football) players
Northern Premier League players
Southern Football League players
Association football forwards
Black British sportspeople
2021 CONCACAF Gold Cup players